The 101st Aviation Regiment is an aviation regiment of the U.S. Army.

Lineage
Constituted 7 December 1950 in the Regular Army as the 4th Light Aviation Section

Activated 19 December 1950 in Korea

Inactivated 5 November 1954 in Korea

Redesignated 1 July 1956 as the 101st Aviation Company, assigned to the 101st Airborne Division, and activated at Fort Campbell, Kentucky

Reorganized and redesignated 3 December 1962 as Headquarters and Headquarters Company, 101st Aviation Battalion (organic elements constituted 15 November 1962 and activated 3 December 1962 at Fort Campbell, Kentucky)

Reorganized and redesignated 16 October 1987 as the 101st Aviation, a parent regiment under the United States Army Regimental System

Distinctive Unit Insignia
 Description
A silver color metal and black enamel eagle  in height overall, with wings elevated, between the wings a three-segmented red scroll inscribed "WINGS" at the top, "OF THE" in the middle and "EAGLE" on the lower scroll in silver letters. 
 Symbolism
The eagle in flight represents Aviation. It also alludes to the 101st Airborne Division, to which the organization is assigned. 
 Background
The distinctive unit insignia was originally approved for the 101st Aviation Battalion on 22 April 1965. It was redesignated for the 101st Aviation Regiment, effective 16 October 1987, and amended to update the description and symbolism.

Coat of Arms

Blazon
 Shield
Azure, a pile lozengy at the point Argent, in chief a mullet of eight rays per fess wavy Gules and of the first. 
 Crest
On a wreath of the colors, Argent and Azure, between two triangles Sable a horse's head Argent. 
Motto WINGS OF THE EAGLE. 
 Symbolism
 Shield
Teal blue and white are the colors formerly used by Aviation units. Participation by the parent unit (4th Aviation Section) in the actions at Whitehorse Mountain, Triangle Hill and Sniper Ridge in Korea is denoted by the three corners of the wedge shape in the center. The projection at its base represents the Kumsong Salient action. The aviation section is credited with eight campaigns in Korea, and these are cited by the estoile (with eight rays) in the colors of the Korean taeguk, further symbolizing award of the Korean Presidential Unit Citation. 
 Crest
The crest is symbolic of the action at Whitehorse Mountain, Triangle Hill and Sniper Ridge. 
 Background
The coat of arms was originally approved for the 101st Aviation Battalion on 2 March 1965. It was redesignated for the 101st Aviation Regiment, effective 16 October 1987, and amended to update the blazon and symbolism.

Subordinate unit lineage

1st Battalion, 101st Aviation Regiment

 Headquarters and Headquarters Company (HHC)
 Constituted 15 November 1962 in the Regular Army as Company A, 101st Aviation Battalion, an element of the 101st Airborne Division
 Activated 3 December 1962 at Fort Campbell, Kentucky
 Inactivated 4 April 1979 at Fort Campbell, Kentucky
 Activated 30 September 1981 at Fort Campbell, Kentucky
 Reorganized and redesignated 16 October 1987 as Headquarters and Headquarters Company, 1st Battalion, 101st Aviation Regiment, and remained assigned to the 101st Airborne Division. Organic elements concurrently constituted and activated.
 Company A
 Company B
 Iraq 2003 – 2004
 Company C
 Company D

2nd Battalion, 101st Aviation Regiment
 HHC
 Constituted 15 November 1962 in the Regular Army as Company B, 101st Aviation Battalion, an element of the 101st Airborne Division
 Activated 3 December 1962 at Fort Campbell, Kentucky.
 Reorganized and redesignated 16 October 1987 as Headquarters and Headquarters Company, 2nd Battalion, 101st Aviation Regiment, and remained assigned to the 101st Airborne Division
 Inactivated 16 November 1988 at Fort Campbell, Kentucky
 Activated 16 August 1991 at Fort Campbell, Kentucky
 Company A "Renegades" (AH-64D)
 Iraq 2003–2004
 Company B "Reapers" (AH-64D)
 Iraq 2003–2004
 Company C

3rd Battalion, 101st Aviation Regiment
 HHC
 1 July 1968 in the Regular Army as Company C, 101st Aviation Battalion, an element of the 101st Airborne Division
 Activated 20 December 1968 in Vietnam.
 Reorganized and redesignated 16 October 1987 as Headquarters and Headquarters Company, 3rd Battalion, 101st Aviation Regiment, and remained assigned to the 101st Airborne Division.
 Company A "Killer Spades" (AH-64D)
 Afghanistan 2002 – HQ at Kandahar Airfield.
 Company B "Blue Max"
 Afghanistan Jan 2009 – Jul 2009
 Company C "Widowmakers"
 Afghanistan Dec 2008 – Dec 2009

4th Battalion, 101st Aviation Regiment
 HHC
 Constituted 1 July 1968 in the Regular Army as Company D, 101st Aviation Battalion, an element of the 101st Airborne Division
 Activated 20 December 1968 in Vietnam
 Inactivated 30 September 1981 at Fort Campbell, Kentucky
 Redesignated 16 October 1987 as Headquarters and Headquarters Company, 4th Battalion, 101st Aviation Regiment, and activated at Fort Campbell, Kentucky, as an element of the 101st Airborne Division
 Company B 
 Afghanistan Dec 2008 – Nov 2009
 Company C
 Afghanistan Jan 2009 – Jul 2009
 Afghanistan Feb 2011 – Feb 2012
 Company F
 Afghanistan Dec 2008 – Dec 2009

5th Battalion, 101st Aviation Regiment
 HHC
 Constituted 16 September 1987 in the Regular Army as the 5th Battalion, 101st Aviation Regiment, assigned to the 101st Airborne Division, and activated at Fort Campbell, Kentucky

6th Battalion, 101st Aviation Regiment
 HHC
 Constituted 16 September 1987 in the Regular Army as the 6th Battalion, 101st Aviation Regiment, assigned to the 101st Airborne Division, and activated at Fort Campbell, Kentucky
 Battalion was formed using the assets of the 123rd Aviation Battalion. The 123rd had been reactivated on 17 December 1985 from aviation assets within the 101st Division's command groups and the 163rd Aviation Company.

7th Battalion, 101st Aviation Regiment
 HHC
 Constituted 7 December 1950 in the Regular Army as the 4th Light Aviation Section.
 Activated 19 December 1950 in Korea
 Inactivated 5 November 1954 in Korea
 Redesignated 1 July 1956 as the 101st Aviation Company, assigned to the 101st Airborne Division, and activated at Fort Campbell, Kentucky
 Reorganized and redesignated 3 December 1962 as Headquarters and Headquarters Company, 101st Aviation Battalion
 Headquarters Company, 101st Aviation Battalion reorganized and redesignated 16 October 1987 as Headquarters and Headquarters Company, 7th Battalion, 101st Aviation Regiment, and remained assigned to the 101st Airborne Division

8th Battalion, 101st Aviation Regiment
 HHC
 Constituted 16 October 1987 in the Regular Army as the 8th Battalion, 101st Aviation Regiment, assigned to the 101st Airborne Division, and activated at Fort Campbell, Kentucky

9th Battalion (Support), 101st Aviation Regiment
 HHC
 Constituted 16 December 1989 in the Regular Army as the 9th Battalion, 101st Aviation Regiment, assigned to the 101st Airborne Division, and activated at Fort Campbell, Kentucky
 In 2004, the 9th Battalion (Support) was redesigned as the 563rd Aviation Support Battalion and was deployed in 2005 to Iraq.

See also
 List of United States Army aircraft battalions
 U.S. Army Regimental System
 United States Army Aviation Branch

References

Citations

Bibliography

External links
 U.S. Army Center Of Military History 
 United States Army Aviation Museum

101
Military units and formations established in 1987
101st Airborne Division